Riccardo Maciucca (born 24 October 1996) is an Italian footballer who plays as a defender.

Professional career
Maciucca began his playing career on for Grosseto, on loan from Latina, in the 2015/16 season. Maciucca made his professional debut for Latina in a Serie B 1-0 win over Virtus Entella on 25 April 2017.

Maciucca joined Vibonese on 21 August 2018.

References

External links
 
 
 Maciucca Latina Profile
 Maciucca Serie A Profile

1996 births
People from Cisterna di Latina
Living people
Italian footballers
F.C. Grosseto S.S.D. players
Latina Calcio 1932 players
Matera Calcio players
U.S. Vibonese Calcio players
Serie D players
Serie B players
Serie C players
Association football defenders
Footballers from Lazio
Sportspeople from the Province of Latina